Panther Creek is a stream in Caldwell County in the U.S. state of Missouri.

Panther Creek was named for fact the area once was the hunting ground of panthers.

See also
List of rivers of Missouri

References

Rivers of Caldwell County, Missouri
Rivers of Missouri